South Tees Hospitals NHS Foundation Trust is responsible for the management of two North East hospitals, James Cook University Hospital in Middlesbrough, and Friarage Hospital in Northallerton.

In July 2019 a merger with North Tees and Hartlepool NHS Foundation Trust was being discussed.

Performance

The Trust was highlighted by NHS England as having 3 of 148 reported never events in the period from April to September 2013.

The Trust logged 466 breaches of the 30 minute handover rule from ambulances to its A&E department during the same period as well as 126 breaches of the 60 minute target, triggering fines of £219,000.

A Care Quality Commission survey found that the Trust was among the best in England for its maternity services in December 2013.

In the 2014 national cancer patient experience survey, the trust had its best ever results with nine out of ten cancer patients rating their care at The James Cook University Hospital and Friarage Hospital as “very good” or “excellent” with some departments achieving 100% patient satisfaction in a number of areas. After being ranked one of the most highly rated trusts in England by patients, the trust has now been selected to mentor University Hospitals Bristol NHS Foundation Trust as part of a volunteer "buddy" scheme to help them improve their patients’ experience of care.

It was named by the Health Service Journal as one of the top hundred NHS trusts to work for in 2015.  At that time it had 7,840 full-time equivalent staff and a sickness absence rate of 4.45%. 70% of staff recommend it as a place for treatment and 52% recommended it as a place to work.

In 2014/5 the trust was given a loan of £17.7 million by the Department of Health which is supposed to be paid back in five years.

In June 2019, the Care Quality Commission rated critical care inadequate, and found that harm had occurred to patients because beds were not available.  "Like many other NHS trusts, South Tees is not meeting national targets for treating A&E patients within four hours, those awaiting planned care inside 18 weeks and cancer patients within a variety of timescales." In September Siobhan McArdle, the chief executive, resigned.  She said demands for further efficiency savings were "too great a challenge" and "that the personal cost of being a CEO in the NHS is just too high and life is just too short."  She told her staff that the trust was "not an organisation that requires improvement." She said it was "financially unsustainable" without a long-term recovery plan to deal with its private finance initiative and other long-term debts.  She said the local health economy was "underfunded and unsustainable."  Her resignation letter, first published in the Health Service Journal received national coverage.  It was later reported that she was only contracted to work four days per week, so her pro-rata salary was around £300,000, much more than her peers, and she was also entitled to 45 days of annual leave. In 2018-19 she was paid £53,000 for overtime on top of her annual salary. 

In April 2020, the trust had over £144 million wiped from its debts by the government to help it focus on combating the Covid-19 pandemic.

Facilities
In June 2014, after 3 years of discussion, it was agreed that the Trust would replace the consultant led maternity service at Friarage Hospital with one led by midwives and transfer its specialist inpatient paediatric services to four other hospitals.

The Trust uses BMI Healthcare's Woodlands Hospital in Darlington to help with elective surgery capacity problems, usually in the winter.  This often involves the same surgeon working on a Sunday.

The Trust had £1.35 million to invest in new technology from the Integrated Digital Care Fund in 2015.

It is one of six centres used by the Defence Medical Services.

See also
 List of NHS trusts

References

External links
 Official website

Health in Yorkshire
NHS foundation trusts